Kirazlı can refer to the following villages in Turkey:

 Kirazlı, Akçakoca
 Kirazlı, Araç
 Kirazlı, Bandırma
 Kirazlı, Çanakkale
 Kirazlı, Düzce
 Kirazlı, İspir
 Kirazlı, Kuşadası
 Kirazlı, Şavşat

See also
 Kirazlı (Istanbul Metro)